Yeah OK is an album by Not Squares. The album was released by the Richter Collective in the UK and Ireland and by Teto Records in Japan.

References

2014 albums